The London Spy by Ned Ward (1660/1667 – June 20, 1731) was a periodical about London life, later published as a book.

First person
Ward first published the story as a series of 16-page periodicals in 1698–1700, comprising 18 folio editions. They were printed as a collection in book form in 1703 by J. How of Gracechurch Street, London, a mile from where Ward had his public house.

The parts are arranged topographically, the story being told in the first person by the author under the persona of "The London Spy". It concerns his adventures as an ostensibly innocent country gentleman visiting London, his native-Londoner chaperone-cum-guide, and the adventures that befall them. They travel about London, visiting inns and tourist attractions and meeting the people who live there. The work depicts vividly the lower classes of the day and how they made ends meet – including prostitution, robbery, burglary and other felonies. It is a ribald story, written in part in prose and containing many slang expressions of the time.

References

The London Spy by Ned Ward, ed. Kenneth Fenwick (1955), The Folio Society: London

1703 books
Social history of London
Publications established in the 1690s
Publications disestablished in 1700